The Ravva oil field in the Krishna Godavari Basin is located in coastal Andhra Pradesh.

Ownership
The field is operated by Cairn India with a 22.5% stake. Its partners in the field are ONGC (40%), Videocon Petroleum (25%) and Ravva Oil (12.5%)

Development and production
The oil field was developed in partnership with Cairn India, ONGC, Videocon and Ravva Oil Singapore Private Limited, under a 25-year production sharing contract (PSC) that expired in 2019. There are eight unmanned Offshore platforms and sub-sea pipelines are being operated. The crude oil produced from the Ravva field is transferred to the Ravva onshore terminal via four pipelines. Processing takes place at a 225-acre facility at Surasani Yanam. The onshore storage capacity is one million barrels.

See also
Bombay High
Krishna Godavari Basin

References

Geography of East Godavari district
Energy in Andhra Pradesh
Geology of Andhra Pradesh
Godavari basin
Oil fields in India
Natural gas fields in India
Vedanta oil and gas fields